Mimicia is a monotypic snout moth genus described by Aristide Caradja in 1925. Its only species, Mimicia pseudolibatrix, described by the same author in the same year, is found in China.

References

Moths described in 1925
Pyralinae
Moths of Asia
Monotypic moth genera
Pyralidae genera